Odetta Sings of Many Things is an album by American folk singer Odetta, issued by RCA Victor in 1964.

Track listing
"Troubled" – 2:25	 
"Miss Katy Cruel" – 1:57	 
"Anathea" – 4:32	 
"Sun's Comin' Up" – 2:55	 
"Boy" – 3:44	 
"Looky Yonder" – 3:15	 
"Froggy Went A-Courtin'" – 2:25	 
"Poor Wayfaring Stranger" – 3:55	 
"Four Marys" – 4:35	 
"Paths of Victory" (Bob Dylan) – 2:25	 
"Sea Lion Woman" – 1:20	 
"Deportee" – 2:25

Personnel
Odetta – vocals, guitar
Bruce Langhorne – guitar, tambourine
Les Grinage (aka Raphael Grinage)– bass

References

1964 albums
Odetta albums
RCA Records albums